The Royal Grenadiers is a 1925 German silent film directed by Géza von Bolváry and starring Heinrich Seitz, Ruth Carel, and Carl Walther Meyer.

It was shot at the Emelka Studios in Munich.

Cast

References

Bibliography

External links

1925 films
Films of the Weimar Republic
Films directed by Géza von Bolváry
German silent feature films
German black-and-white films
Bavaria Film films
Films shot at Bavaria Studios